Pimelodella brasiliensis is a species of three-barbeled catfish of the family Heptapteridae. It is endemic to the Paraíba do Sul river basin in Brazil, although there are unconfirmed records from elsewhere.

References

Bockmann, F.A. and G.M. Guazzelli, 2003. Heptapteridae (Heptapterids). p. 406–431. In R.E. Reis, S.O. Kullander and C.J. Ferraris, Jr. (eds.) Checklist of the Freshwater Fishes of South and Central America. Porto Alegre: EDIPUCRS, Brasil

brasiliensis
Catfish of South America
Freshwater fish of Brazil
Endemic fauna of Brazil
Taxa named by Franz Steindachner
Fish described in 1877